Homoeolabus is a genus of leaf-rolling weevils in the beetle family Attelabidae. There are at least two described species in Homoeolabus.

Species
These two species belong to the genus Homoeolabus:
 Homoeolabus analis (Illiger, 1794) (leaf-rolling weevil)
 Homoeolabus similis Kirby, 1837

References

Further reading

External links

 

Attelabidae
Articles created by Qbugbot